Paolo Cesar Montoya Cantillo (born 15 June 1985) is a Costa Rican cross-country mountain biker. At the 2012 Summer Olympics, he competed in the Men's cross-country at Hadleigh Farm, finishing in 36th place.

References

1985 births
Living people
Sportspeople from San José, Costa Rica
Costa Rican male cyclists
Cross-country mountain bikers
Olympic cyclists of Costa Rica
Cyclists at the 2012 Summer Olympics